The Quebec Liberal Party fielded a full slate of 125 candidates in the 1998 provincial election and won forty-eight seats to retain their status as the Official Opposition party in the National Assembly. Many of the party's candidates have their own biography pages; information about others may be found here.

Candidates

Fabre: Joanne Gauthier
Joanne Gauthier highlighted health and education issues during the campaign. She received 17,507 votes (40.51%), finishing second against incumbent Parti Québécois cabinet minister Joseph Facal.

Labelle: Raymond Laporte
Raymond Laporte received 9,024 votes (31.07%), finishing second against incumbent Parti Québécois cabinet minister Jacques Léonard.

Mercier: Elizabeth da Silva
Elizabeth da Silva highlighted anti-poverty issues during the campaign. She received 9,005 votes (28.42%), finishing second against incumbent Parti Québécois cabinet minister Robert Perreault.

Richelieu: Gilles Ferlatte
Gilles Ferlatte is a former Montreal police inspector who was fifty years old during the election. He had previously sought election for mayor of Tracy in 1995. He attracted controversy in the 1998 campaign when he said that the Hells Angels did not pose a problem in his riding. Party leader Jean Charest quickly distanced himself from this comment, which was widely criticized in the media.

References

1998